Alex Martín Magallanes Broggi (born 15 March 1997 in Peru) is a Peruvian retired footballer.

Career
For the second half of 2018/19, Magallanes signed for Gandzasar Kapan in Armenia through an Argentinean of Armenian descent. His father, Peru international Alex Magallanes, advised him to " have a lot of mental strength because living in Europe is not the same as in Peru". After a few months, Magallanes said that the stadiums were good in Armenia while in Peru they were not maintained. However, he left Gandzasar Kapan after four league appearances due to the new head coach only using players over the age of 26.

References

External links
 Alex Magallanes at Soccerway

Peruvian footballers
Living people
1997 births
Association football defenders